Showtime is the second studio album by grime artist Dizzee Rascal, released on 6 September 2004 and 14 September in the United States. As of May 2007, the album has sold over 16,000 units in the United States—a decline on his debut album, Boy in da Corner, which sold 58,000. It has also been certified Gold by the British Phonographic Industry (BPI) for selling over 100,000 copies.

Critical reception

Showtime received critical acclaim from music critics. At Metacritic, which assigns a normalised rating out of 100 to reviews from mainstream critics, the album received an average score of 87 based on 28 reviews indicating "universal acclaim". AllMusic gave the album 4 and half stars out of 5 saying 'If Showtime isn't the equal artistic success of Boy in da Corner, it's slightly superior, stunning for the facts that it arrives so swiftly after the debut and is far from a retread'. Rolling Stone gave the album 3 and a half stars out of 5 stating that "These are Rascal's most accessible beats to date". The Village Voice gave the album a favorable review saying it is "A brash, dazzling dispatch from a parallel universe" and Billboard also gave a favorable review of the album saying "This is hip-hop for another era, one that makes the present day commercial U.S. material seem even more flat than it already is".

Scott Plagenhoef from Pitchfork Media gave the album 8.6/10 saying "The album naturally lacks the shock of the new, the jolt of Boy in Da Corner-- instead, it's a consolidation of his strengths, lyrically and sonically, and a more satisfying listen than its predecessor". PopMatters gave the album 9/10 saying "Aside from a couple of hiccups (the clunky R&B of "Get By", the silly call and response of "Knock Knock"), it's every bit as good as Boy in da Corner, and sometimes even better". The Guardian gave the album 4 out of 5 stars saying "Beyond his trademark agitated yelp and panic-attack rhythms are all manner of surprising and compelling sonic twists". NME gave the album 9/10 stating that "Lyrically it's astonishing" and Spin gave it a 9/10 saying it is "At its core, Showtime is a classic sophomore album in the hip-hop sense: puffy with bluster, brimming with indignation". Alternative Press gave the album 5 out of 5 stars stating that "It's the urgency of [Dizzee's] brash Brit patois that dares you not to decipher it". Mojo gave an extremely favorable review to the album saying that "What Dizzee Rascal has done with this record is find his own - profoundly satisfying - balance between grime's digital vortex of ringtones and car alarms and an older more contemplative electronic tradition".

Track listing

Charts

References

2004 albums
Dizzee Rascal albums
XL Recordings albums